Christy Lee Rogers is an underwater fine art photographer.

Early life 
Rogers was born in Honolulu, Hawaii and grew up in Kailua, on the island of Oahu.

Career
Rogers’ works have been exhibited globally from Paris, London, Italy, Mexico City to Shanghai, Sao Paulo, South Africa, Los Angeles and more, and are held in private and public collections throughout the world. She has been featured in International Magazines, including Vogue, Harper’s Bazaar Art China, Elle Decoration, Global Times, The Independent, Casa Vogue, Photo Technique, Photo Korea and others.

Rogers’ "Reckless Unbound" is currently housed at Longleat House in the UK. She is a two time finalist for the Contemporary Talents Award from the Fondation François Schneider in France, and has been commissioned by Apple to create underwater images with the iPhone 11Pro. Rogers' art has been featured on several album covers, including “Orchesography” for the 80’s band Wang Chung, and her images were selected for the 2013–2014 performance season of the Angers-Nantes Opera in France.

In 2019 she won Open Photographer of the Year at the Sony World Photography Awards and in 2020 she created the cover image for the 2021 Lavazza Calendar ‘The New Humanity.’

Photography 
Rogers is known for her underwater photography, which has been exhibited in the United States, France, and Monaco. Her work was commissioned by Deutsche Grammophone to provide the album cover art for a boxed set of classical music.

The basis of her technique started experimentally.  She is also known for using real people as her models.

Collections 
 Siren (2009)
 Odyssey (2010)
 Reckless Unbound (2012)
 Of Smoke and Gold (2013)
 Elan (2014)
 Celestial Bodies (2015)
 A Quarter of a Million Miles (2016)
 Hybrids (2017)
 Muses (2018)
 Human (2020)
 Bioluminescence (2022)

Exhibitions & Awards 
Marco Polo Airport, Ten Arts Paris, Venice, Italy (April 15 - December 15, 2022)
Method & Concept, “The Underwater Photography of Christy Lee Rogers”, Naples, Florida (January 13 - February 25, 2022)
Art Labor Gallery, “Human”, Shanghai, China (May 15 - June 30, 2021)
Laura Rathe Fine Art, “Tidepools”, Houston, Texas (Jan. 14 - Feb, 11, 2021)
Centre Pastoral Saint-Merry, Ten Arts Paris, Installation, Paris, France (Dec 23 2020 - Jan 27, 2021)
Minnesota Marine Art Museum, “Christy Lee Rogers - Baroque Water Worlds”, Minnesota, US (May 8 - September 6, 2020)
Art Labor Gallery, “Harmony”, Shanghai, China (Aug 25 - Sept. 15, 2019)
Miller Gallery, "Weightless", Cincinnati, Ohio (July 25 - Aug. 27, 2019)
Laura Rathe Fine Art, "Changing Tides", Dallas, Texas (Jan. 5 - Feb. 9, 2019)
Art Labor Gallery, "Muses", Shanghai, China (June 23 - August 8, 2018)
 Angers Nantes Opéra House, Grand Théâtre d'Angers, Ten Arts, “Le lyrisme des abysses - Retrospective Show”, Angers, France (Sept. 19 - Nov. 20, 2014)
 The Outsiders Gallery, Lazarides, “Élan", London, United Kingdom (June 12 - July 19, 2014)
 Honolulu Museum of Arts - Academy Arts Center at Linekona, "An Underwater Odyssey", Honolulu, Hawaii (2011)
 Let There Be Art Gallery, “Celestial Bodies", Mexico City, Mexico (August 6, 2015 September 6, 2015)

External links
Royal Photographic Society - "Why Christy Lee Rogers finds beauty underwater"
Digital Camera World - "Space not the final frontier for photographer and visual artist Christy Lee Rogers"
BBC - "Extraordinary Portraits" - Episode two: Christy Lee Rogers and Cee Cee
GQ Italy - The Lavazza 2021 Calendar is "The New Humanity"
Rolling Stone Italy - Tutte le foto del Calendario Lavazza 2021
Vogue Polska - Christy Lee Rogers: Beautiful Chaos
Meet A Scientologist - Christy Lee Rogers

References

Living people
American photographers
Underwater photographers
Photographers from Hawaii
Year of birth missing (living people)